Absolute Taste, is a UK-based catering company with Head Quarters in Bicester. Gary Kennerley is its managing director. It had £20m annual turnover in 2008. It has run projects with Gordon Ramsay Holdings (GRH), McLaren Group, and fleets of private jets. It runs five cafés and restaurants and caters for private parties. Absolute Taste's most notable venue is the McLaren Technology Centre.

History 

Absolute Taste was formed in 1997 by Ron Dennis and Lyndy Redding. Redding had just graduated from Tante Marie with a diploma and produced a 3-page business proposal to Dennis to start a catering company. Dennis owned a 55% interest. Initially centred on providing hospitality for the VIP guests of the McLaren Racing around the world, and for employees at the McLaren headquarters, the company grew and developed a separate identity.

Absolute Taste provided the catering for David Beckham and Victoria Beckham's 2006 FIFA World Cup send-off party, based on Gordon Ramsay's menu.

Absolute Taste catered Nelson Mandela’s 90th Birthday party and Chelsea FC footballer John Terry's wedding.

In 2003, Absolute Taste Inflight was formed. It is a 24-hour, 365-day operation catering for private jets. It began at the suggestion of some McLaren employees and was vetted for a year on a shareholder's own plane. Six vans now deliver pre-prepared gourmet meals to airports all over the South of England.

The company's tenth anniversary happened in 2008, when it announced a partnership with Gordon Ramsay Holdings. "Gordon Ramsay by Absolute Taste" is an entirely bespoke service in which Absolute Taste works with Gordon and his team to produce food from his restaurants for outside events. Ramsay and Redding had met previously at Aubergine, Ramsay's restaurant, when a pastry chef had left the clear paper on Redding's chocolate fondant and Ramsay apologized to her. They met again at a McLaren F1 event when Ramsay was McLaren's guest.

Absolute Taste was acquired by One Event Management in December 2016.

Cafés 

Absolute Taste operates three cafés. The Design Café and Dome Café are situated in Chelsea Harbour Design Centre. DetoxRetox at Harvey Nichols. There is also the Apron Café at Farnborough Airport. Absolute Taste now operates 13 restaurants, based mainly in the south of England.

References

External links 
 Official website

Catering and food service companies of the United Kingdom